The 1st Marine Artillery Regiment is one of the oldest marine artillery units in the military of France, as part of the troupes de marine within the French Army {Founded 1692}.

History
With two infantry marine regiments it formed the 2nd Brigade of the Blue Division during the Franco-Prussian War. Based in Laon since 1993, it is the artillery regiment of the 2nd Armoured Division.

1956 −1962: A detachment of the regiment participated in operations in Algeria.

1977: The regiment left Melun for the new garrison at Montlhéry.

1993: On 2 August the regiment took its new headquarters in Laon Couvron, a former air base.

1993 - 1996: The 1er RAMa sends detachments in Bosnia and Herzegovina, in the Rapid Reaction Force (RRF) (Serb bombardment of the batteries Mount Igman) during the bombing of Bosnia Herzegovina by NATO 1995ou of IFOR, in charge of enforcing the Dayton.

2009: The regiment received the first cannon CAESAR June 10 This gun replaces the AMX AUF1 in service since 1990. On 1 August it left the 2nd Armoured Brigade, after 42 years and joined the 1st Mechanised Brigade.

Etendard (Standard/Colours) of the regiment

The banner is decorated with the Cross of the Legion of Honor, the Croix de Guerre 1914-1918 (two palms), the Croix de Guerre 1939-1945 (three palms) and the Cross of Liberation. He is entitled to use the forage in the colors of ribbon the Croix de Guerre 1914 1918 since August 13, 1918, with olive-colored ribbon for the Croix de Guerre 1939-1945. Then from 18 June 1996 to feed the ribbon colors of the Croix de la Liberation.

Honours

Battle Honours
Lutzen 1813
Mexique 1838-1863 
Sebastopol 1855
Bazeilles 1870
Sontay-Langson 1883-1884
Dahomey 1892
Madagascar 1895
Champagne 1915-1918 
La Somme 1916
Bir-Hakeim 1942
El-Alamein 1942
Takrouna 1943 
Carigliano 1944
Colmar 1945
AFN 1952-1962

Decorations
Cross of the Légion d'honneur
Cross of the Liberation
Croix de guerre 1914-1918 with 2 palms
Croix de guerre 1939-1945 with 3 palms

Sources and bibliography
 Erwan Bergot, La coloniale du Rif au Tchad 1925-1980, imprimé en France : décembre 1982, n° d'éditeur 7576, n° d'imprimeur 31129, sur les presses de l'imprimerie Hérissey.

Artillery,01
Companions of the Liberation
Marine,01
20th-century regiments of France
21st-century regiments of France
Military units and formations established in the 1690s
1692 establishments in France